Lyubomir Bogdanov (born 21 December 1982) is a Bulgarian former football midfielder.

Bogdanov played for FK Baník Most in the Czech Gambrinus liga before joining Minyor for the 2008–09 A PFG season.

References

External links

1982 births
Living people
Bulgarian footballers
Association football midfielders
FK Baník Most players
First Professional Football League (Bulgaria) players